François Delage is a French businessman, entrepreneur, investor, adviser and board member.

Career
François Delage holds a business degree in Management and Finance from the European Business School. He began his career in finance at Louis Vuitton, then Polychrome France and The Walt Disney Company, before rejoining Louis Vuitton as finance director for Europe and Middle East in 1995.

In 1999, Delage was appointed general manager for LVMH Fashion Brands (Celine, Fendi, Loewe, Louis Vuitton) in Micronesia (Guam and Saipan), based in Guam. 

In 2001, he was appointed President for the Asia Pacific region for Louis Vuitton, based in Hong Kong. In February 2007, Delage was appointed CEO for Ralph Lauren Asia Pacific.

De Beers
Delage was CEO of De Beers Jewellers, from July 2009 to September 2020. 

At De Beers, Delage led the brand strategy and turnaround, opened and developed China and Greater China, launched High Jewellery  and most recently initiated and executed the transformation of the business to Omnichannel.

Under his leadership, De Beers Jewellers fostered diversity and inclusion, internally and externally in all its marketing activities, and was one of the first luxury brands to celebrate women, their talents and empowerment with the precursor programme "Moments in Light".

Delage had joined De Beers Jewellers from Forevermark, the diamond brand from De Beers Group, where he also held the position of CEO, and as such launched and developed the brand from late 2007.

Personal life
Delage has lived and worked in London since September 2007.

External links

 Francois Delage on OmniChannel www.com 
Jewellery on Instagram Francois Delage 
Mobile customer engagement

References

Living people
French jewellers
French chief executives
Year of birth missing (living people)